Wattanasin is a surname. Notable people with the surname include:

Charoen Wattanasin (born 1937), former badminton player from Thailand
Jetrin Wattanasin, Thai pop musician and actor

Thai-language surnames